Lukáš Bajer (born 15 December 1984, in Přerov) is a Czech footballer midfielder who played in the Czech National Football League, Czech First League, Eredivisie, Kazakhstan Premier League, Moldovan National Division, Canadian Soccer League and Greek Amateur Division

Playing career 
Bajer began his career in 2004, with Atlantic Slovan Pardubice in the Czech National Football League. He had stints in with 1. SC Znojmo, SK Hanácká Slavia Kroměříž, Dosta Bystrc. In 2007, he signed with SK Sigma Olomouc of the Czech First League featuring in 96 matches, and recorded five goals. In 2008, he was loaned to the Eredivisie to play for Heracles Almelo. In 2012, he went abroad to Asia to play with FC Aktobe, and returned to Czech Republic to play for FK Viktoria Žižkov. In 2013, he signed with FC Milsami Orhei of the Moldovan National Division. On August 29, 2014, Bajer signed a contract with Kingston FC of the Canadian Soccer League. In July 2016 Bajer signed contract with Koronis Koiladas of the Greek Amateur Division and scored 18 goals in 25 appearances. After his impressive season, he signed with Doxa Virona also a team that played in the Greek Amateur Division. He didn't make an appearance there so he moved back to Koronis Koiladas in January. He didn't impress scoring only 3 goals in 15 matches so Koronis Koiladas didn't renew his contract. After some days him being a free agent he signed with Aristionas Lygouriou a team that is in the Greek Amateur Division.

References

External links 
 
 Player profile 
 Player profile ,

1984 births
Living people
Czech footballers
Association football midfielders
SK Sigma Olomouc players
Heracles Almelo players
FC Aktobe players
FK Viktoria Žižkov players
FC Milsami Orhei players
Kingston FC players
Czech First League players
Eredivisie players
Kazakhstan Premier League players
Moldovan Super Liga players
Canadian Soccer League (1998–present) players
Czech expatriate footballers
Expatriate footballers in the Netherlands
Czech expatriate sportspeople in the Netherlands
Expatriate footballers in Kazakhstan
Czech expatriate sportspeople in Kazakhstan
Expatriate footballers in Moldova
Czech expatriate sportspeople in Moldova
Expatriate soccer players in Canada
Czech expatriate sportspeople in Canada
Expatriate footballers in Greece
Czech expatriate sportspeople in Greece
Sportspeople from Přerov